Drosophila acutilabella is a Neotropical species of fly in the genus Drosophila.

References 

acutilabella
Insects described in 1953